Indian Telly Awards for Best Game Show is an award given by IndianTelevision.com as a part of its annual Indian telly awards for TV serial recognize the Best Game Show on Indian Television.

Winners
The following is the list of Winners of Telly Award for Best Game Show.

References

External links
 Official Website

See also
 Indian Telly Awards
 11th Indian Telly Awards
 12th Indian Telly Awards

Indian Telly Awards